Colinet may refer to:

 Colinet, Newfoundland and Labrador, Canada
 Colinet de Lannoy (died circa 1497), French composer
 Marie Colinet (circa 1560-1640), midwife-surgeon
 Jérôme Colinet (born 1983) Belgian footballer